The Parbhani Municipal Corporation is D grade Municipal Corporation of Maharashtra, the governing body of the city of Parbhani, situated beside the Collector Office, and District Court. The municipal corporation consists of democratically elected members, is headed by a mayor and administers the city's infrastructure, public services and supplies. Members from the state's leading various political parties hold elected offices in the corporation.

In 2011 Maharashtra State cabinet decided to elevate Parbhani along with Latur and Chandrapur to municipal corporation as city crossed mark of 3,00,000 population in 2011 census. First election for the Municipal Corporation was conducted in 2012, after the predecessor City Council's term ended.
Parbhani Municipal Corporation has been formed with functions to improve the infrastructure of town.

Revenue sources 

The following are the Income sources for the Corporation from the Central and State Government.

Revenue from taxes  
Following is the Tax related revenue for the corporation.

 Property tax.
 Profession tax.
 Entertainment tax.
 Grants from Central and State Government like Goods and Services Tax.
 Advertisement tax.

Revenue from non-tax sources 

Following is the Non Tax related revenue for the corporation.

 Water usage charges.
 Fees from Documentation services.
 Rent received from municipal property.
 Funds from municipal bonds.

List of Mayor

Election results

2017 results 
The second election took place on 19 April and result came out on 21 April.
Congress candidates won in 31 wards out of the 65 wards of Parbhani Municipal Corporation. NCP came at second position, winning 18 wards, while the BJP could bag 8 seats. Shiv Sena won 6 seats and independent 2.

2012 results 
The results of the Election 2012 are as follows.

References 

Parbhani
Municipal corporations in Maharashtra
2012 establishments in Maharashtra